Scopula risa is a moth of the family Geometridae. It is found in Saudi Arabia.

References

Moths described in 1982
risa
Moths of Asia